Rugby Special was the main rugby union programme on the BBC in the UK. The show ran from 1966 and past presenters included David Vine, Keith Macklin, Cliff Morgan, Chris Rea, Nigel Starmer-Smith, Bill Beaumont and John Inverdale. The main commentators were Bill McLaren, Cliff Morgan, Nigel Starmer-Smith, David Parry-Jones, Martyn Williams, Lynn Davies, Jim Neilly and Eddie Butler.

From 1994-95 the programme was contracted out to an independent production company Chrysalis after 28 years as an in-house BBC production.

The programme ended its original run in 1997 after losing the rights to cover English domestic games, the Heineken Cup and England home tests to Sky and Welsh domestic matches to HTV/S4C. The S4C involvement was controversial as BBC Wales was providing much of S4C's Welsh Language sports coverage under the BBC Cymru brand.

At the start of 1998, Sunday Grandstand became a year-round programme and Rugby Special merged into Sunday Grandstand with rugby union highlights, as well as live coverage, becoming part of the programme.

The programme returned on late Thursday nights in 2002 but was discontinued in 2005, when it was a highlights programme of Autumn internationals and Six Nations with studio guests and an audience of fans from the Six Nations. But when the Premiership highlights rights were regained from the 2001–02 season highlights were shown on Sunday Grandstand.

Rugby Special returned to the BBC on 7 February 2016, covering the highlights of Six Nations. The programme returned in 2023 again covering highlights of the Six Nations.

Theme music
In the early seventies, the theme tune was "Spinball" by Paddy Kingsland but this was later replaced by "Holy Mackerel" by The Shadows' drummer, Brian Bennett which was replaced for one season 1988–89 by the Kenny G version of "What Does It Take (To Win Your Love)" from the 1986 Duotones album replaced from 1989–90 to 1993–94 by a specially commissioned theme.

Scheduling
1966–1976 Saturday Nights
1976–1980 Sunday Afternoons
1980–1981 Saturday Nights
1981–1984 Sunday Afternoons
1984–1985 Saturday Nights 
1985–1988 Sunday Afternoons
1988–1997 Sunday Early Evenings
2002–2005 Thursday Late Nights

Regional opt out versions
From the 1986–87 season, BBC2 Wales, BBC2 Scotland and BBC Two Northern Ireland started their own regional versions. These programmes went out at the same time as the main version broadcast in England from London. The BBC2 England version would still show one or two club games from Wales and Scotland as a second or third match.

Previously, Wales Rugby Union highlights had been broadcast on BBC1 Wales on Sunday Afternoons under the Sports Line-Up title, and later as Weekend Rugby Union with David Parry-Jones as presenter and commentator. He would carry on as presenter when Martyn Williams took over the commentator role with Phil Bennett as co-commentator. When the Rugby Union highlights moved to BBC2 Wales, it became known as Rugby Special Wales with David Parry-Jones and Martyn Williams continuing in the roles in the first season. For 1987/88, Alan Wilkins became the presenter though he would also deputise as a commentator when Martyn Williams wasn't available with Martyn Williams as the main commentator and Phil Bennett in the commentary box until the end of the 1988–89 season. Lynn Davies took over as commentator from the 1989-90 season and carried on until 1995, again with Phil Bennett as co-commentator when it would become Scrum V where he would continue as commentator until 1998 when Huw Llywelyn Davies would take over the English Language commentator role for a short time before returning to his Welsh Language commentator role on S4C.

The Scottish programme went out as Rugby Special from Scotland with Bill Johnstone presenting in the late 1980s until the mid-1990s, when the programme was now aired under the Sportscene banner as Sportscene Rugby Special and at this point the presenters was Mark Souster until he was replaced by Jill Douglas in the late 1990s and in the programme's final year, former rugby player John Beattie took over hosting duties with Gary Parker co-hosting with John around the early 2000's. The commentator for all live matches and highlights was Bill McLaren.

The Northern Ireland version mostly covered matches involving Ulster Rugby and was a co-production with RTE due to the fact that Rugby Union in Ireland is governed on a United Ireland basis under the Irish Rugby Football Union banner. The commentators were Jim Neilly and Fergus Slattery.

References

External links
Rugby union (BBC)

BBC Television shows
Rugby union in England
Rugby union in Ireland
Rugby union in Scotland
Rugby union in Wales
Rugby union in Italy
Rugby union in France
1960s British sports television series
1970s British sports television series
1980s British sports television series
1990s British sports television series
2000s British sports television series
2010s British sports television series
2020s British sports television series
BBC Sport
Rugby union on television